Lamin Conateh (born 1 October 1981 in Bakau) is a Gambian footballer, who currently plays for Arameiska-Syrianska Botkyrka IF.

Career
Conateh began his career with Steve Biko Football Club in 1999 signed with Wallidan F.C. He left the team after four Gambian Championnat National D1 titles and joined in July 2005 to Bakau United Football Club. After a successful trial in January 2007 signed with Superettan club Assyriska Föreningen.

International career
Bakaye holds three games for his country on international stage.

References

1981 births
Living people
People from Bakau
Gambian Muslims
Gambian footballers
The Gambia international footballers
Wallidan FC players
Gambian expatriate footballers
Gambian expatriate sportspeople in Sweden
Expatriate footballers in Sweden
Bakau United FC players
Association football defenders